Alkimos may refer to:
 Alcimus (mythology), characters from Greek Mythology
 Alkimos, Western Australia, a suburb of Perth, Western Australia
 Alkimos (ship), a merchant ship wrecked on the coast north of Perth, Western Australia
 12714 Alkimos, an asteroid

See also
 Alcimus (disambiguation)